The AfroBasket Most Valuable Player Award is a FIBA award given every two years, to the Most Outstanding player throughout the tournament.

Winners

See also
 FIBA AfroBasket All-Tournament Team
 FIBA Basketball World Cup Most Valuable Player
 FIBA Basketball World Cup All-Tournament Team
 FIBA Awards

References 

Most Valuable Player
Basketball trophies and awards